Iranzu was an important king of Mannae. King Iranzu died in 716 BC (estimated). His son Aza was already occupying the throne at the time and was Iranzu's successor.

Mannaeans
8th-century BC rulers
Year of death uncertain